Kampong Masin is a village in Brunei-Muara District, Brunei, about  from the capital Bandar Seri Begawan. The population was 2,891 in 2016. It is one of the villages within Mukim Pengkalan Batu. The postcode is BH2723.

Geography 
As a subdivision, Kampong Masin shares boundaries with Kampong Bebatik to the north and north-west, Kampong Kilanas and Kampong Bengkurong to the north-east, Kampong Sinarubai and Kampong Burong Lepas to the east, Kampong Junjongan to the south-east, Kampong Parit to the south and south-east, and Kampong Batong to the west.

Facilities 
Masin Primary School is the village primary school, whereas Masin Religious School is the village school for the country's Islamic religious primary education.

The village is home to Masin Secondary School, the secondary school for Mukim Pengkalan Batu.

Kampong Masin Mosque is the village mosque; it was inaugurated by the then Minister of Religious Affairs on 27 December 1987. The mosque can accommodate 500 worshippers.

References 

Masin